Paul Revere (1734–1818), was an American activist and artisan.

Paul Revere may also refer to:

 Paul Revere (musician) (1938–2014), American musician in Paul Revere & the Raiders
 Paul Revere Braniff (1897–1954), airline entrepreneur
 "Paul Revere" (song), a 1986 song by the Beastie Boys
 "Paul Revere", a song by Johnny Cash from the 1972 album America: A 200-Year Salute in Story and Song
 Paul Revere of Texas
 Paul Revere class, a two ship class of assault transports of the United States Navy, named for the lead ship of the class, USS Paul Revere (APA-248)
 Paul Joseph Revere (1832–1863), general in the Union Army during the American Civil War

See also
 Paul Revere's Ride, historical event and poem describing it
 Revere (disambiguation)

Revere, Paul